Ramiro Pez (born 6 December 1978 in Córdoba, Argentina) is an Italian Argentine rugby union footballer who normally plays at fly-half. In 2008-09, he joined the newly promoted French Top 14 club Toulon, having been signed from Venezia Mestre in the Italian Super 10 competition.

He made his international debut with the Italian national team on 8 July 2000, in a match against Samoa in Apia, scoring 9 points in the game.

Pez played with the National team both with Brad Johnstone and John Kirwan, but he did not take part to the 2003 World Cup. Back with the Italian team for the 2005 tour in Australia and Argentina, Ramiro Pez gave his fundamental contribution for the first Italian win against Argentina (30-29).

Pez played for La Tablada in his hometown of Córdoba. The club won the title in November 2000, scoring all his teams' points in a 23-22 victory over Duendes Rosario. He went on to join Italian club Rugby Roma. He scored 122 points and 6 tries in 19 Serie A appearances. This included an Italian Championship final win over L’Aquila in Rome in June 2000. He scored 20 points in the final. He then joined Rotherham club for the 2001-02 season and was their top points scorer with 202 points, as they won the National Division One title. It was here where he enjoyed some of his best years, breaking into the Italy team and gaining national and international acclaim.

He spent the 2003-04 season with the Leicester Tigers. After playing with Bath he joined French side USA Perpignan. He played 13 matches that season with the Tigers, scoring 100 points for the club.

After a poor 2008/09 season at Toulon he was released to make way for the likes of Jonny Wilkinson and Felipe Contepomi. He has since moved back to Argentina to play for his home side La Tablada.

References

External links
RBS 6 Nations profile
Ramiro Pez on tigers.co.uk
Ramiro Pez Parts Ways with Leicester
Ramiro Pez Joins As Fly Half Cover

1978 births
Argentine rugby union players
Bath Rugby players
Italian people of Argentine descent
Italian rugby union players
Italy international rugby union players
Leicester Tigers players
Living people
Sportspeople from Córdoba, Argentina
Rotherham Titans players
Rugby Roma Olimpic players
Rugby union fly-halves
USA Perpignan players